Cyprium may refer to:
Copper, an element with the Latin name cuprum
Cyclamen cyprium, a cyclamen that is endemic to the island of Cyprus